Sir Henry Green, of Boughton,(died 6 August 1369) was an English lawyer, and Chief Justice of the King's Bench from 24 May 1361 to 29 October 1365. He was speaker of the House of Lords in two Parliaments (1363–64).   

He was the son of Sir Thomas Greene (or de Greene) of Boughton and Lucy la Zouche, daughter of Eudo la Zouche and sister of  William la Zouche, 1st Baron Zouche. Early in his career, he served both Queen consort, Isabel, and her grandson, Edward the Black Prince. He was made a justice of the Court of Common Pleas in 1354, and knighted by King Edward III. In 1357, he was excommunicated for non-appearance at the trial of Thomas de Lisle, bishop of Ely, in Avignon. 

About the same time he had a violent quarrel with the prominent Mallore family of Litchborough, who were neighbours of his in Northamptonshire. Green accused Sir Peter Mallore, a former MP and High Sheriff of Northamptonshire, and his son Sir Giles of assaulting him. Both men were found guilty and imprisoned in the Tower of London, but were eventually pardoned on the intercession of King David II of Scotland.

In 1365, while Chief Justice, he was arrested along with Sir William de Skipwith, the Chief Baron of the exchequer, and stripped of his office. The charge was probably corruption; both Green and Skipwith were fined for their offences. There is no evidence of permanent disgrace and although he was never again employed as a judge, he kept his considerable estates. Green married  Katherine Drayton, daughter of Sir Simon Drayton.

Death
He died in 1369, and was buried in the church in Boughton in Northamptonshire. 

At his death, his possessions descended to his two sons, Thomas and Henry. Henry the younger was executed in 1399 at Bristol Castle by the Duke of Hereford (the future Henry IV) for his role as a councillor of Richard II.

During his life, he is credited with having bought the village of Greens Norton, in Northamptonshire for a price of 20 shillings. There is a memorial in the parish church to Greene and his wife, even though they are buried at Boughton.

Sources 

1369 deaths
14th-century English judges
People excommunicated by the Catholic Church
Lord chief justices of England and Wales
Justices of the Common Pleas
Year of birth unknown
Knights Bachelor
People from Northamptonshire